Nautile is a crewed submersible owned by Ifremer, the French Research Institute for Exploitation of the Sea.

Nautile is capable of housing three people. It has a length of 8 m, still imaging cameras, two colour video cameras, and a number of floodlights. It is fitted with two robotic arms to allow remote manipulation.  Nautile can stay underwater for up to eight hours at a time. Two ships can act as mothership to Nautile: Pourquoi Pas? and Atalante. In its early days, Nautile was launched from RV Nadir.

The vessel has been used to examine the wreck of the RMS Titanic and to search for the black boxes from Air France Flight 447

See also

References

External links

 Nautile — specification from Ifremer website
 Nautile: miniature submarine — BBC news article
 Submarine to examine sunken oil tanker — New Scientist article
 Le Nautile — technical information from Ifremer website 

Deep-submergence vehicles
Bathyscaphes
Research submarines of France
1984 ships